The 1996 European Community Championships was a men's tennis tournament played on indoor carpet courts at the Sportpaleis Antwerp in Antwerp in Belgium and was part of the Championship Series of the 1996 ATP Tour. The tournament ran from 19 February through 25 February 1996. Michael Stich won the singles title.

Champions

Men's singles

 Michael Stich defeated  Goran Ivanišević 6–3, 6–2, 7–6(7–5)
 It was Stich's 1st title of the year and the 27th of his career.

Men's doubles

 Jonas Björkman /  Nicklas Kulti defeated  Yevgeny Kafelnikov /  Menno Oosting 6–4, 6–4
 It was Björkman's 1st title of the year and the 11th of his career. It was Kulti's 1st title of the year and the 4th of his career.

References

External links
 ITF tournament edition details

European Community Championships
ECC Antwerp